Choppa Style is the debut album by rapper Choppa. It was released on January 28, 2003 through Take Fo Records and featured production from Choppa, "Henry the Man", DJ Ron and Sammy Huen. The album barely made it on Billboard's Top R&B/Hip-Hop Albums, peaking at #99 on the chart, but the single "Choppa Style" managed better on the single charts, making it to #49 on the Hot R&B/Hip-Hop Singles & Tracks and #94 on the Billboard Hot 100.

Track listing

Charts

Singles

2002 debut albums
Choppa albums